Dancing Girls is an 1896 British short black-and-white silent film directed and produced by Birt Acres.

External links 
 

1896 films
British short documentary films
British silent short films
Documentary films about dance
Films directed by Birt Acres
1890s dance films
British black-and-white films
1890s short documentary films